Thomas Hickman (13 January 1848–4 September 1930) was a New Zealand policeman. He was born in Pont Audemer, France on 13 January 1848.

References

1848 births
1930 deaths
New Zealand police officers
French emigrants to New Zealand